Gyraulus albus, common name white ramshorn, is a small species of freshwater snail, an aquatic pulmonate gastropod mollusk in the family Planorbidae, the ram's horn snails.

Gyraulus albus is the type species of the genus Gyraulus.

Distribution
Palearctic:
 Belgium
 Czech Republic - least concern (LC)
 Germany
 Hungary
 Netherlands
 Poland
 Slovakia
 Great Britain
 Ireland

Habitat
This small snail lives in various types of freshwater habitats among weed and on bottom mud. It doesn't require a high level of calcium.

Description
The shell of this species is rather small, reaching a height of 1.3 - 1.8 mm and a width of 4 – 7 mm. This shell has a discoid shape with 4 - 4½ body whorls that expand in the direction of the aperture. This aperture and the whorls are curved and do not have a keel.

The shell of this species is white (sometimes darkened by mud deposits) and has a characteristic spiral sculpture.

References

Further reading
V. Pfleger & June Chatfield, A guide to the snails of Britain and Europe; Hamlyn Publishing Group, London, 1988;

External links
Gyraulus albus at AnimalBase

albus
Palearctic molluscs
Gastropods described in 1774
Taxa named by Otto Friedrich Müller